Caverna High School is a small public high school located in Horse Cave, Kentucky, United States. Built in 1950, the school is operated by the Caverna Independent Schools, one of only a handful of school districts in Kentucky that are known to operate across county lines (the others being in Burgin and Eminence, cities near a county line whose districts include a small amount of territory in the nearby county, and Corbin, a city that straddles a county line). In 1950, Horse Cave, located in Hart County; Cave City, in Barren County; and the Kentucky Board of Education held a meeting that approved the union of the two districts because of the low student numbers in both school systems. The actual construction of the new school did not start until 1951. Originally the school was going to be named, "Caberma." However, it was decided to stay with the name "Caverna."

Overview
The schools daily production is led by the principal and staff. The management of the financial and other resources are kept by the board of trustees. Trustees are appointed by previous trustees who are stepping down from their positions. The principal and new facility are appointed by the members of the Site Base Decision Committee board. The Site Base council consists of three faculty members and two parents of the students who are not seniors are elected. (Elections are held in October.)  The faculty of the school is responsible for rearing students to academic success and to be a role model for all students. The first class ever to graduate from Caverna High school consisted of seven boys and four girls. Now, the enrollment has grown tremendously pushing close to two hundred students.

Academics
The curriculum of Caverna High School will meet these individual and common needs. It will prepare students for the responsibilities of American citizenship, assist him/her in selecting and preparing for an occupation, aid in his/her physical development, intellectual curiosity, develop cultural and moral values, and cultivate the ability to think rationally. Classes are held Monday-Friday, 8:15am–3:15pm CST. Caverna uses the GPA (Grade Point Average) grading system. An A is 100–90, B is 89–80, C is 79–70, D is 69–60, F is 59 and below. Students are given resources such as books which are to be returned after the end of the Spring Semester. Many students who graduate from Caverna High School frequently enroll in Western Kentucky University.

Graduation requirements
Students are required to have eight (8) semesters of high school residence to be eligible for graduation from Caverna High school. Students who are eligible for graduation are expected to have all charges, fees, etc. owed to the school before they receive a signed diploma. A student must meet all graduation requirements to graduate including the appropriate number of credits to receive a signed diploma.

Effective with the graduating Class of 1999, any ties for the honor of Valedictorian and Salutatorian figured from the 4.0 grade point scale, will be broken by averaging the final numerical grade from all classes taken in grades nine (9) through twelve (12).

Valedictorian and Salutatorian shall be students who have attended Caverna High School grades nine (9) through twelve (12).

Caverna High Diploma Requirements
Students must successfully complete:
 4 credits of English
 4 credits of math (Algebra I, Algebra II, Geometry, and Senior Math/Precal/Cal)
 3 credits of social studies (Law & Justice, World Civics, and U. S. History)
 4 credits of science (Intro to Chemistry and Physics, Biology, Integrated Science plus Chemistry/Advanced Chemistry/Physics/Conceptual Physics/Anatomy)
 1 credit in foreign language (required for all students)/College Bound students must have two (2) credits
 1 credit of humanities (Band or Art also count for this credit)
  credit of health
  credit of physical education
 2 seminar credits (one in Freshmen Seminar and one in Senior Seminar)
 4 electives (these may come in various offerings including Seminar, Vocational and Humanities Courses).
 24 total credits

College placement
 High school graduation rate: 80.0%
 College-going rate: 50.0%
 Percentage with developmental needs in one or more subjects: 83.3%
 Percentage with developmental needs in English: 55.6%
 Percentage with developmental needs in mathematics: 61.1%

as of 2008*

Student life
Caverna High School does not have a dress code. However, there are restrictions to what students can wear during scheduled hours. Boys are not to wear inappropriate or suggestive shirts pertaining to drugs, alcohol, or sexual content. Girls are not to wear non-revealing shirts, straps on shirts may be no less than two fingers wide. No shorts or skirts are to be above the knee. Both genders are not allowed to wear sunglasses or hats. However, dress code is only required in a classroom setting. The yearbook is created by students enrolled into the "yearbook staff" course and is distributed and available at the beginning of the Fall semester the next year. Seniors will be notified when the yearbook is available at Caverna High Schools office.

Summer school
Summer school is available for students who do not have a D or higher in a course and that are a credits shy from moving up into the next grade level. It is a five-week program that begins two weeks after graduation (each year varies).

Clubs and organizations
 Varsity Academic Team
 BETA/Jr. Beta
 Freshman Academic Team
 FCCLA (Family, Career, and Community Leaders of America)
 Caverna Band
 Guitar Club
 FFA (Future Farmers of America)
 Art Club
 Student Council
 Pep Club
 Yearbook Staff
 FCA (Fellowship of Christian Athletes)
 ETS (Educational talent Search)
 TSA (Technology Student Association)
 National Honor Society
 SADD (Students Against Destructive Decisions)

Campus facilities
The main building is Caverna High School/Caverna Middle School. The high school is located on the second floor of the building while the middle school is on the main floor of the building. Each school shares the band classroom (first floor), detention hall classroom (first floor), the main computer lab (second floor), the cafeteria (first floor), and the gym (first floor) which is attached to the main building, located in the back of the school. On campus, there is the Caverna High School Softball Field, Ralph Dorsey Baseball Field, Caverna High School Tennis Court, and the B.H. Weaver Football Stadium. Off campus, hosted by the Caveland Country Club, the golf team uses the golf course.

Athletics

Varsity teams

Fall sports
Boys
Cross country
Football
Golf
Marching band
Girls
Cheerleading
Golf
Volleyball
Marching band
Winter sports
Boys
Basketball
Girls
Basketball
Cheerleading
Spring sports
Boys
Baseball
Tennis
Track and field
Girls
Softball
Track and field
Tennis

Notable alumni

Clarence Glover, basketball player for Boston Celtics (1971-1973).
Denny Doyle, baseball player for Philadelphia Phillies (1970–1973), California Angels (1974–1975) and Boston Red Sox (1975–1977). 
Brian Doyle, baseball player for New York Yankees (1978-1981).

References

1950 establishments in Kentucky
Educational institutions established in 1950
Public high schools in Kentucky
Education in Barren County, Kentucky
Schools in Hart County, Kentucky